Michael Byrne may refer to:

Entertainment
 Michael Byrne (actor) (born 1943), English actor
 Michael Byrne (poet) (born 1978), Australian poet
 Mike Byrne (guitarist), American guitarist for The Methadones
 Mike Byrne (musician) (born 1990), American drummer with Smashing Pumpkins

Sports
 Mick Byrne (Australian footballer) (born 1958), Australian rules footballer
 Michael Byrne (baseball), American college baseball pitcher
 Michael Byrne (footballer, born 1880) (1880–?), English-born Irish footballer with Chelsea, Southampton and Glossop
 Michael Byrne (footballer, born 1985), English-born Welsh footballer playing for Chainat
 Michael Byrne (gridiron football) (born 1986), American football offensive lineman
 Michael Byrne (hurler) (born 1978), Irish hurler
 Mick Byrne (Irish footballer) (born 1960), Irish footballer
 Mickey Byrne (1923–2016), Irish hurler

Other
 Michael Byrne (sailor) (1761–?), born in Kilkenny, Ireland
 Michael J. Byrne (1941–2020), Australian oncologist

See also
 Micky Burn (1912–2010), English journalist
 Michael Burns (disambiguation)